The 2017 Uruguayan Primera División season is Peñarol's 117th consecutive season in the top-flight of Uruguayan football, and 126th year in existence as a football club. They entered this season looking to rebound from a disappointing 2016 season, when they finished 14th in the table. The season covers the period from 5 February 2017 to the end of the same year, marking the transition from a biannual season to an annual season.

Monthly season review

Club

Coaching staff

Kit

Kit information

Squad

Squad information

Transfers

In

Out

Pre-season

Competitions

Primera División

Torneo Apertura

League table

Evolution

Match resumes

Copa CONMEBOL Libertadores 
Peñarol qualified for the 2017 Copa Libertadores group stage after becoming champion of the 2015-16 Primera División. The club entered sorting from Pot 1 as  Uruguay 1.

Group stage

Group table

Match resumes

Statistics 

Peñarol seasons
Uruguayan football clubs 2017 season